Dennis Phillips may refer to:
 Dennis Phillips (poet) (born 1951)
 Dennis Phillips (poker player) (born c. 1955), amateur poker player